Xincheng could refer to the following towns in China:

Xincheng Town, Jiaxing (新塍镇), in Xiuzhou District, Jiaxing, Zhejiang

Gansu
Xincheng, Jiayuguan, first-order division of Jiayuguan City
Xincheng, Lanzhou, in Xigu District, Lanzhou
Xincheng Town, Lintan County, in Lintan County
Xincheng Township, Qingshui, in Tianshui

Hebei
Xincheng, Gaobeidian
Xincheng, Shahe
Xincheng, Xinji

Jiangxi
Xincheng, Dayu County, in Dayu County
Xincheng, Jinggangshan, in Jinggangshan City

Shanxi
Xincheng, Xiangfen County, in Xiangfen County
Xincheng, Youyu County, in Youyu County
Xincheng, Yuanqu County, in Yuanqu County

Elsewhere
Xincheng, Guangdong, in Xinxing County
Xincheng, Huachuan County, Heilongjiang
Xincheng, Hubei, in Dawu County
Xincheng, Yizheng, Jiangsu
Xincheng, Huantai County, Shandong
Xincheng, Sichuan, in Zhaojue County
Xincheng, Tianjin, in Binhai New Area